Progresso, a brand of General Mills, is an American food company that produces canned soups, canned beans, broths, chili, and other food products.

History 
Progresso emerged from the merging of two prominent Italian importing companies in New Orleans, Louisiana. In 1925, Vincent Taormina, who had traveled east to start a tomato importing business, and Giuseppe Uddo merged their companies. Vincent's family owned the "Taormina Brothers Grocery" of New Orleans, Louisiana. Frank had emigrated from Italy and joined his cousin Vincent in the venture.

They were so successful selling tomatoes that they sold more orders than they could fill and needed funds to set up the infrastructure for a larger canning operation. Giuseppe Uddo, who had already established a national canning operation, brought the Taorminas on board to form a new merged company. The resultant company was "The Uddo and Taormina Corporation" and they created the Progresso label, specializing in canned Italian food products, which became mostly soup, olive oil, tomatoes, spaghetti, ravioli and beans, sold since 1949.

The Pillsbury Company acquired Progresso in 1988.  General Mills acquired Pillsbury in 2001.

Market strategy 
For the last 20 years, Progresso soup has been seen as an upmarket alternative to market leader Campbell, and as a meal replacement. Progresso cans were both larger than Campbell's cans and came "ready-to-heat" rather than being condensed, which helped them attain popularity before Campbell's released the competitive and similar "Chunky" line of products.

Campbell's Soup Company has since gone on to produce several lines of ready-to-eat soups in reaction to Progresso's innovations.

References

External links

General Mills brands
Brand name soups
American companies established in 1925
Food and drink companies established in 1925
1925 establishments in Louisiana